Ibrahim Dabo was the leader of the Fulani Sullubawa in Kano and founder of the eponymous Dabo dynasty. His progeny has lasted over two centuries reigning as Muslim rulers of the ancient city-state of Kano. The dynasty has become synonymous with the ancient city-state in affectionate sayings as "Kano ta Dabo Cigari". They have independently ruled the Kano Emirate from 1819 until the Battle of Kano in 1903 which as a result of British colonisation transformed into the Kano Emirate Council.

Dabo reigned as Emir of Kano from 1819 to 1846. He embarked upon policies to centralize the administration and raise revenue. During his reign he was responsible for establishing several ribats, including Fanisau and Waceni. His centralization saw the revival of old royal slave titles which he exploited to consolidate his power. Dabo invaded the Ningi chiefdom but was defeated by Gwarsum at Basshe.

In order to re-establish his authority and independence, Dabo re-introduced the elaborate court and regalia of the Bagauda dynasty after the Kano Emirate was invaded by Muhammad al-Kanemi of Bornu who was looking to seize the city-state as a buffer zone between the Bornu Empire and the Sokoto Caliphate, his army was subsequently annihilated by the Emir of Bauchi after having failed to breach the ancient Kano city walls.

Biography 
Dabo was a pious Islamic scholar and one-time student of Emir Suleimanu, one of Dabo's works Kaff al-Ikhwani has been recovered and was later published. He was known to have written out the Qur'an and had three daughters and several sons.

Rise to power 
He was appointed Emir of Kano on 23/24 Dhul Qa’ada 1234 AH (21 September 1819) by Sultan Muhammad Bello fulfilling the wish of Emir Suleiman.

Death and succession 
He died on Friday 9th Safar 1262 AH (9 February 1846) and was succeeded by his elder son Usman I. (Ado-Kurawa 1989: 53 and Last 1966: 468-9).

Dynasty 
Patrilineal descent is the principle behind membership in royal houses, as it can be traced back through the generations. In the Royal House of Kano, descent is traced back patrilineally to Ibrahim Dabo.

 Usman I Maje Ringim dan Dabo (ruled 1846-1855)
 Abdullahi Maje Karofi dan Dabo (ruled 1855-1883)
 Muhammadu Bello dan Dabo (ruled 1883-1893)
 Muhammadu Tukur dan Bello dan Dabo (ruled 1893-1894)
 Aliyu Babba dan Abdullahi Maje Karofi dan Dabo (ruled 1894-1903)
 Muhammad Abbass dan Abdullahi Maje Karofi  dan Dabo (ruled 1903-1919)
 Usman II dan Abdullahi Maje Karofi dan Dabo (ruled 1919-1926)
 Abdullahi Bayero dan Abbas dan Abdullahi Maje Karofi dan Dabo (ruled 1926-1953)
 Muhammadu Sanusi I dan Abdullahi Bayero dan Abass dan Abdullahi Maje Karofi dan Dabo (ruled 1954-1963)
 Muhammad Inuwa dan Abbas dan Abdullahi Maje Karofi dan Dabo (ruled 1963 - he served for 3 months only)
 Ado dan Abdullahi Bayero dan Abbas dan Abdullahi Maje Karofi dan Dabo (ruled 1963-2014)
 Muhammadu Sanusi II dan Chiroman Kano Aminu dan Muhammadu Sanusi I dan Abdullahi Bayero (ruled 2014-2020)
 Aminu dan Ado dan Abdullahi Bayero (2020–present)

Ibrahim Dabo was the father of Osumanu (Usman I) (ruled 1846-1855), Abdullahi (ruled 1855-1883), and Muhammad Bello (ruled 1883-1892).

Biography in the Kano Chronicle
Below is a full biography of Ibrahim Dabo from Palmer's 1908 English translation of the Kano Chronicle.

References

Emirs of Kano
19th-century rulers in Africa